Holts Summit is a small city in Callaway County, Missouri. The population was 3,247 at the time of the 2010 census. It is part of the Jefferson City Metropolitan Area.

History
Most of the pioneers in the early settlements were from the state of Virginia. One among them was Abner Holt who with his family traveled to Howard County, Missouri, in 1819. They settled there for the winter. The men built a house in Callaway County in the unnamed community now known as Holts Summit, and the family settled in during the spring.

In 1870, Holt's grandson, Timothy Holt, plotted Holts Summit around a general store built by his father James Holt. They named the village “Holts Summit” because it was the highest point from there to the Missouri River.

“Hibernia Station” was once located across from where North School is now located. The train carried travelers between Hibernia and Holts Summit. Because of declining traffic as autos became more popular, the train depot was torn down in 1934.

Holts Summit was incorporated in 1973.

In the 1960s and 1970s, winemakers began to rebuild the Missouri wine industry. Summit Lake Winery was founded in 2002 in Holts Summit, linking the town to what is called the Missouri Rhineland, the area defined by vineyards along the Missouri River from Callaway County to the western part of St. Charles County.

Geography
Holts Summit is located at  (38.648569, -92.116831).

Demographics

2010 census
As of the census of 2010, there were 3,247 people, 1,377 households, and 896 families residing in the city. The racial makeup of the city was 92.1% White, 3.9% African American, 0.3% Native American, 0.5% Asian, 0.1% Pacific Islander, 1.0% from other races, and 2.1% from two or more races. Hispanic or Latino of any race were 2.2% of the population.

There were 1,377 households, of which 30.8% had children under the age of 18 living with them, 46.1% were married couples living together, 13.9% had a female householder with no husband present, 5.1% had a male householder with no wife present, and 34.9% were non-families. 28.0% of all households were made up of individuals, and 10.4% had someone living alone who was 65 years of age or older. The average household size was 2.35 and the average family size was 2.83.

The median age in the city was 37.7 years. 22.7% of residents were under the age of 18; 8.5% were between the ages of 18 and 24; 27.5% were from 25 to 44; 28.4% were from 45 to 64; and 12.8% were 65 years of age or older. The gender makeup of the city was 48.0% male and 52.0% female.

2000 census
As of the census of 2000, there were 2,935 people, 1,124 households, and 794 families residing in the city. The population density was 886.3 people per square mile (342.4/km2). There were 1,227 housing units at an average density of 370.5 per square mile (143.1/km2). The racial makeup of the city was 94.51% White, 2.96% African American, 0.85% Native American, 0.07% Asian, 0.27% from other races, and 1.33% from two or more races. Hispanic or Latino of any race were 1.26% of the population.

There were 1,124 households, out of which 39.1% had children under the age of 18 living with them, 50.6% were married couples living together, 14.2% had a female householder with no husband present, and 29.3% were non-families. 24.3% of all households were made up of individuals, and 7.2% had someone living alone who was 65 years of age or older. The average household size was 2.58 and the average family size was 3.04.

In the city, the population was spread out, with 30.3% under the age of 18, 9.2% from 18 to 24, 31.4% from 25 to 44, 20.0% from 45 to 64, and 9.1% who were 65 years of age or older. The median age was 32 years. For every 100 females, there were 94.8 males. For every 100 females age 18 and over, there were 90.2 males.

The median income for a household in the city was $35,313, and the median income for a family was $40,701. Males had a median income of $29,622 versus $23,576 for females. The per capita income for the city was $16,633. About 7.6% of families and 11.2% of the population were below the poverty line, including 13.3% of those under age 18 and 14.4% of those age 65 or over.

Schools
The first school began as a one-room building, but with the growing community, it became necessary to be annexed to the Jefferson City School District. There are now two schools in Holts Summit. North School, where there are approximately 374 students enrolled from kindergarten through fifth grade. And the second school is Callaway Hills, which has about 273 students enrolled from kindergarten through fifth grade. The middle schools and high schools are located in Jefferson City.

Churches
There are a wide variety of churches in Holts Summit. Some of them are Yahweh's Restoration Ministry, Union Hill Baptist Church, St. Andrews Catholic Church, General Baptist Church, Summit First Assembly of God, Pleasant Ridge Baptist Church, Shiloh United Methodist Church, Cedar Grove Baptist Church, Grace Lutheran Church, and the Community Presbyterian Church.

Culture
Every year the city of Holts Summit hosts the annual Easter Egg Hunt and Christmas parade. The Easter Egg Hunt is usually held around the first Sunday in April at the Hibernia Station Park. The Christmas Parade is held on the second Saturday in December. Floats are made from different organizations and groups, from Boy Scouts of America to the Holts Summit Optimist Club.

Attractions
The Summit Lake Winery opened in 2002 and is located on the bluff overlooking Highway 54, Missouri River, and Jefferson City. Here, visitors are able to taste test some of their Midwest wines and bistro or their Native American and French Hybrid wines year-round.

The first city park was opened in 1999. Hibernia Station Park has a playground area, a full size basketball court, and a pavilion with barbecue pits, picnic tables, and benches. There is also a three quarter mile walking trail which winds around and through the park.

Notable person 

 Justin Smith, former NFL player

References

External links
 City of Holts Summit official website

Cities in Callaway County, Missouri
Jefferson City metropolitan area
Missouri Rhineland
Cities in Missouri